The Imperial Harem of the Ottoman Empire was the Ottoman sultan's harem – composed of the wives, servants (both female slaves and eunuchs), female relatives and the sultan's concubines – occupying a secluded portion (seraglio) of the Ottoman imperial household. This institution played an important social function within the Ottoman court, and wielded considerable political authority in Ottoman affairs, especially during the long period known as the Sultanate of Women (approximately 1533 to 1656). Multiple historians claim that the sultan was frequently lobbied by harem members of different ethnic or religious backgrounds to influence the geography of the Ottoman wars of conquest. The utmost authority in the Imperial Harem, the valide sultan, ruled over the other women in the household; the consorts of the sultan were normally of slave origin, and thus were also his mother, the valide sultan.

The Kizlar Agha (also known as the "Chief Black Eunuch" because of the Nilotic origin of most aghas) was the head of the eunuchs responsible for guarding the Imperial Harem.

Etymology 

The harem as a social and political institution
As the sultan became increasingly sedentary in the palace, his family members, previously dispersed between provincial capitals, were eventually relieved of their public duties and gathered in the imperial capital. The official move of members of the Ottoman dynasty to the harem at Topkapi Palace in the sixteenth century gradually transformed the imperial harem into a well-organized, hierarchical, and institutionalized social and political structure, with rigid protocols and training. At the end of the sixteenth century, except for the sultan himself, no member of the royal family, male or female, left the capital. Both children and mothers were permanent occupants of the inner world of the palace. The harem was the ultimate symbol of the sultan's power. His ownership of women, mostly slaves, was a sign of wealth, power, and sexual prowess. The emphasis on seclusion of the harem and dynastic life from the public gaze also communicated his power, as only those closest to him had the privilege to interact with him privately. The only person in the harem who had access to public only with "ritual and retinue appropriate to her status," was the valide sultan. The institution was introduced in the Turkish society with adoption of Islam, under the influence of the Arab caliphate, which the Ottomans emulated. To ensure the obedience of the women, many of them were bought and kept into slavery. However, not all members of the harem were slaves. The main wives, especially those taken into marriage to consolidate personal and dynastic alliances, were free women. This was the exception, not the rule.

The imperial harem also served as a parallel institution to the sultan's household of male servants. The women were provided with an education roughly equal to with that provided to male pages. At the end of their respective educations, the men and women would be married off to one another and "graduated" from the palace to occupy administrative posts in the empire's provinces. There was a distinct hierarchical structure within the harem, founded on family-based relationships among the women. This family was not limited to blood connections but included the whole royal household, consisting mainly of slaves for the majority. Following the evolution of the imperial harem from the sixteenth century onward shows that, while the organizational structure of the harem was never static and the numbers and roles of servants within the palace was constantly fluid, there was a strong sense of institutional continuity and unchangingly rigid hierarchies within the harem. The valide sultan, the sultan’s mother, held power over the harem and this power sometimes extended over society. She was the custodian of imperial power, and worked to consolidate both her son’s rule and continuation of the dynasty. She resided at the top of the female hierarchy. Next in line were the sultan’s daughters, who were also called sultans. These princesses were admired and could rival their father for popularity and recognition. They were also useful for the political alliances that their marriages secured for the empire. These women were known throughout the empire and had an important reputation to uphold. Consequently, only a small fraction of the women in the harem actually engaged in sexual relations with the sultan, as most were destined to marry members of the Ottoman political elite, or else to continue service to the valide sultan. Within the harem, the valide sultan and the sultan's favorite concubine or concubines were more effectively able to create factional support for themselves or their sons, creating a bridge between the palace and the outside world. Harem politics revolved around the establishment of matrilineal legacies and finding ways to garner alliances and support from the greater Ottoman world outside of the harem walls.

Harem quarters 
The Imperial Harem occupied one of the large sections of the private apartments of the sultan at the Topkapi Palace which encompassed more than 400 rooms. The harem had been moved to Topkapi in the early 1530s. After 1853, an equally lavish harem quarter was occupied at the new imperial palace at Dolmabahçe.The structure of the imperial palace was meant to communicate “both the identity of the sovereign’s residence as the central arena of the empire and the difficulty of obtaining access to the sovereign within that arena.”

Topkapı Palace

The Architectural Layout of Topkapi Palace 

The strategic location and architectural design of the harem quarters within Topkapi Palace reflected a vital shift in the Harem’s newfound influence and power within the palace. In previous palaces, the harem quarters were always located in the far back of the palace, hidden away from much of the palace population. In the layout of the Topkapi Palace, the Harem was located in the right wing just behind the imperial council building; for the first time in Ottoman history, the imperial harem was central and visible in Ottoman political life. The centralization of the harem’s living quarters in Topkapi Palace reflected a changing in power dynamics between the men of the palace and the women of the harem.

The Topkapı Palace served as the royal residence of the Ottoman sultan for four centuries. There is a wealth of sources about this structure making it one of the most fully documented buildings in the Islamic world. The architectural structure of the harem changed over time due consecutive sultans' renovations. During the time of Murad III (1574-1595) each of his 40 wives had separate quarters within the Topkapı harem. Young slave girls, on the other hand, inhabited a large dormitory. At this time, women's sexual relations with the sultan determined their living quarters. Once a slave girl had sex with the sultan she received her own chamber, attendants, kitchen maids, a eunuch, and pay. All of these were increased if she became pregnant. If she bore a child she might be moved into an even larger apartment. Sultan Murad III alone tripled the size of the Imperial Harem from 1574 to 1595.

By the mid 18th century an Imperial hall, also known as the "privy chamber," took on Europeanizing decorations and inscriptions dating from the renovations made by Osman III. This was a spacious, domed hall that overlooked the garden and was the place where official ceremonies and festivities took place. The Queen Mother's quarters during this time consisted of a suite with a bedroom, throne room, bath, rooms for her servants, a bakery, commissary, and kitchens which were all grouped around the largest court of the harem, known as the Queen Mother's Court.

Over the course of the sultans' residences at Topkapı Palace the harem was first a residence for slave girls, then became an area of the palace run by the sultan's favorite wife, then finally a spacious area focused on the sultan's family and run by the Queen Mother. The rank of individuals residing in the harem is reflected in its architecture and the quarters were continuously remodeled according to new requirements and changing fashions. This resulted in the space being a collection of ever more fragmented spaces.

Dolmabahçe Palace 
In 1842, the Dolmabahçe Palace started to be built. It was created for entertainment and "relaxation" purposes for the Sultans and their families. In 1856, the palace became available to the Sultans, their families, and the harem. The imperial harem chambers were placed at the back of Dolmabahçe Palace, and functioned much the same as within Topkapi up until the dissolution of the Ottoman Empire in 1922.

Yıldız Palatial Complex 

Though the history of the Yıldız Palace begins in 1795 when Selim III built a pavilion there for his mother (Selim III), marking a moment when the Valide Sultans began managing and inhabiting their own hilltop estates, the complex is widely known as having been the residence of the Ottoman Sultan Abdülhamid II beginning in 1880. The palatial complex is demarcated by the Çırağan Palace on the waterfront and extending up to a valley between Besiktas and Ortaköy.

After assassination attempts, Abdülhamid II moved his immediate family to the Yıldız Palace to live in an already standing two-story mansion known as the Şale Kiosk. This became the new harem quarters following its location at the Dolmabahçe Palace. Given that this new site did not have enough space to support the number of women in the imperial harem, it was downsized with wives, unmarried sisters, and servants being moved elsewhere.

In 2014 a project began to restore and refurbish the harem of the Yıldız Palace in order to open the space up for tourism. Following this project scholars and others began to research and learn more about the harem architecture, ornate decor, furnishings, and everyday lives of its inhabitants. Much of this work has yet to be published.

Roles and Positions of the harem

Role of the 

The mother of a new sultan came to the harem with pomp and circumstance and assumed the title of valide sultan or sultana mother upon her son's ascension. She would become a prominent leader, whose power extended over the harem as well as the members of the dynasty. The  who influenced the political life of the Ottoman Empire during various periods of history (such as the Sultanate of Women in the 16th and 17th centuries) had the authority to regulate the relations between the sultan and his wives and children. When a prince left the capital for his provincial governorate, he was accompanied by his mother. In this way, she was able to fulfill her duty of directing the prince’s domestic household through training and supervision. At times the  acted as regent for her son, particularly in the seventeenth century, when a series of accidents necessitated regencies that endowed the position of valide sultan with great political power.

The  influenced the way that the Ottoman sultans waged wars of conquest. Ottoman conquests were mostly in the West until the mid-1500s. Given that the succession of the Ottoman throne was a deliberately non-institutionalized and highly random event, there was a great deal of variation in the ethnic and religious backgrounds of the Ottoman valide sultans, and the ethnic background of the valide sultan was a major determinant of whether military conquests would be for North Africa, the Middle East, or Europe. The sultans were more likely to be mindful of their matrilineal descent as the princes’ mothers were primarily responsible for their upbringing and highly socialized them into their customs and ethnic backgrounds. Matrilineal background was so important that a European maternally descended sultan was more than 70 percent less likely to orient the empire’s imperial conquests towards the West. That said, Ottomans' military ventures in Europe were generally reinforced by a Muslim matrilineal genealogy. Regardless of how the Ottoman harem had developed over time as an organization, the main observation is that the royal mothers had the most direct and sustained interaction with the future sultans of the Ottoman Empire and left an indelible mark on the reigns of their sons.

Role of the court ladies

For the perpetuation and service of the Ottoman dynasty, slave girls were either captured in war, given as gifts to the Sultan and the dynastic family on special occasions, recruited within the empire, or procured from neighbouring countries to become imperial court ladies (cariyes). The number of female slaves within the harem varied over time, and the harem itself was regularly renewed as a result of the practice of manumission. Manumission of the previous sultan’s concubines was especially common upon the enthronement of a new sultan. Most enslaved girls were Christian, and came from various countries, regions, and ethnic groups, including Circassia, Georgia, Russia, and Africa. There was no standard practice that determined what age girls entered the harem. Some arrived as children, while others entered at a later age. This slave trade was formally banned in 1854 but the ban was on paper only. After 1854, almost all court lady-slaves were of Circassian origin; the Circassians had been expelled from Russian lands in the 1860s and the improverished refugee parents sold their daughters in a trade that was formally banned but tolerated.

Upon arrival at the palace, all of the women and girls began a transformation process to accord with their new life. They were converted to Islam through recitation of the core Islamic creed, and were given new names that accorded with their physical appearance or personality. They were prevented from contacting their families and were trained in court manners and activities, on the Islamic religion, and the Turkish language to prepare for life at court.

Odalisque, a word derived from the Turkish Oda, meaning chamber: thus connoting odalisque to mean chamber girl or attendant, was not a term synonymous with concubine; however, in western usage the term has come to refer specifically to the harem concubine.

The s, often introduced into the harem at a young age, were brought up in the discipline of the palace. This was the largest group of women within the harem. Inexperienced female slaves who newly entered the imperial palace were called acemi (novice), and their early period of service and training was known as acemilik (novitiate) before they were eligible to gain promotions within the system. There was a strict hierarchical system of status and role within the harem and s. They were promoted according to their capacities, intellect, and skill. The harem was broken down into two main groups: those who directly served the sultan as consorts and those who worked in the service of the sultan, the dynasic family, and other high-ranking members of the harem. All women and girls would enter the harem as acemi cariyes, and work their way up to acemilik, then sakird (apprentices), in hopes of eventually being promoted to the role of a gedikli (directly waited on the sultan), usta (mistress), or even kadin (consort) if they were lucky enough.

Right below the s in rank were the s, whose number was unspecified. Last in the hierarchy were the s.

During 16th and 17th centuries, chief consort of the sultan received the title haseki sultan or sultana consort. This title surpassed other titles and ranks by which the prominent consorts of the sultans had been known (hatun and kadın). Such cases happened during the eras of the Hürrem Sultan and Kösem Sultan.

Royal concubines of non- status 
In the century following the deaths of Suleyman and Hurrem, concubines who were not favorites of the sultan would become forgotten women of the harem. The only ones remembered are those that were brought into the public eye by the question of succession. Their status was inferior to the preferred concubines. They were also not identified among the family elite of the harem.

The court ladies had contact with the outside world through the services of intermediaries such as the Kira.  However, the harem was intentionally very cloistered and hidden away from the public eye, so contact with the outside world was very limited. The harem was kept inaccessible to both the Ottomans and foreign visitors to preserve the privacy and sanctity of the consorts, future sultans, and harem at large.

The Legacy of Hurrem Sultan
Hurrem Sultan, also called Roxelana, was a female concubine who completely transformed the harem system and left a lasting impact on the Ottoman Empire. Roxelana is believed to have been kidnapped from Ruthenia or “Old Russia” located in modern-day Ukraine and renamed Hurrem “the cheerful one” upon her arrival in Istanbul. As a concubine, Roxelana somehow caught the attention of Sultan Suleiman I and he continued to call for her to return to his bed. Roxelana bore her first son, Mehmed, in 1521, after the sultan’s first two sons passed away, and the two soon had more children. That Roxelana was allowed to give birth to more than one son was a stark violation of the old royal harem principle of “one concubine mother — one son,” and it signaled to the outside world that a powerful woman was emerging in Suleiman’s court. Sometime around 1533-1534, Suleiman declared Roxelana a free woman and married her, violating yet another 300-year-old custom of the Ottoman harem in which sultans were not to marry their concubines and marking the first time a former harem slave was elevated to the powerful role of spouse. No other children were born to Suleiman from another concubine during his entire reign. Suleiman wrote love poetry for her and letters while he was away at war. He even had grand monuments built for her to exhibit his love. She became known as Haseki, “the favorite,” but some accused her of seducing Suleiman with sorcery. Many in the Ottoman public did not appreciate Suleiman’s total devotion to one woman and the ensuing radical changes in the harem hierarchy, but Roxolana’s great perseverance, intelligence, and willpower gave her an edge over other women in the harem. 
Roxelana became Suleiman’s most loyal informant when he was away and after his mother’s death. Roxelana has become known as “one of the most legendary women of early modern history.”  She dedicated grand foundations to the needy and showed special compassion towards slaves. She also ensured that the talented women of the harem left the palace service to marry a deserving partner. She transformed the royal harem at Topkapi Palace into a political institution, meaning royal women lived and worked at the center of the government. Roxelana completely changed the way in which women were treated within the harem and was largely responsible for modernizing the Ottoman Empire.

Role of the eunuchs

At Topkapı Palace, at the court of the Ottoman sultans, the harem staff included eunuchs. At the beginning of the seventeenth century, the corps of harem eunuchs numbered between 800 and 1,200. This was, and would remain, the highest number of eunuchs ever employed at the harem. These were Nilotic slaves captured in the Nile vicinity. The sultans were able to obtain these slaves because of their conquest of Egypt in 1517, which gave direct access to slave caravans who used those routes. The conquest of northeastern Sudan in the 1550s continued to expand the empire's reach and access to slave caravans that used trade routes through Sudan. The castrated servicemen in the Muslim and Turkish states in the Middle Ages were recruited to serve in the palace from the times of Sultan Mehmed I onwards. These eunuchs who were trained in the palace and were given the charge of guarding the harem rose in rank after serving in many positions. The harem eunuchs and the harem organization were under the command of the chief harem eunuch, who was also called the Master of the Girls or chief black eunuch. They supervised the quarters where the female population of the palace lived. They had influence on the palace and later on the state administration in the 17th and 18th centuries as they had access to the sultan and the sultan's family and became very powerful.

The office of the chief harem eunuch was created in 1574. The chief black eunuch was sometimes considered second only to the grand vizier (head of the imperial government, but often working in his own palace or even away, e.g., on military campaigns) in the confidence of the Sultan, to whom he had and arranged access (including his bedchamber, the ne plus ultra for every harem lady), also being his confidential messenger. Some of their basic duties was to watch over the women in the harem, negotiating and speaking to both the sultan and their relatives, and supervising the palace and keeping everyone safe.

Meanwhile, the chief white eunuch, was in charge of 300 to 900 white eunuchs as head of the 'Inner Service' (the palace bureaucracy, controlling all messages, petitions, and State documents addressed to the Sultan), head of the Palace School, gatekeeper-in-chief, head of the infirmary, and master of ceremonies of the Seraglio, and was originally the only one allowed to speak to the Sultan in private. In 1591, Murad III began to give a higher and more meaningful position to black eunuchs due to an increase of crime by white eunuchs. Despite all of this, many black eunuchs suffered oppression from white eunuchs because of their physical bodies and race.

During the Sultanate of Women, eunuchs increased their political leverage by taking advantage of minor or mentally incompetent sultans. Teenage sultans were "guided" by regencies formed by the queen mother, the grand vizier and the 's other supporters – and the chief black eunuch was the queen mother's and chief consorts' intimate and valued accomplice. Kösem Sultan, mother of Sultan Ibrahim (r. 1640-1648) and grandmother of Sultan Mehmed IV (r. 1648-1687), was killed at the instigation of the mother of Mehmed IV, Turhan Sultan, by harem eunuchs in 1651.

: The kızlar ağası was the chief black eunuch of the Ottoman seraglio. The title literally means 'chief of the girls', and he was charged with the protection and maintenance of the harem women.

His name means 'lord of the door', and he was the chief of the white eunuchs, acting as a chief servant and procurer.

: The valide sultan was the mother of the reigning sultan and the most powerful woman in the harem, not to mention the empire.

: This was the title reserved for the favorite chief slave consort of the Ottoman sultan. The  had no blood relation with the reigning sultan but ranked higher than the sultan's own sisters and aunts, the princesses of the dynasty. Her elevated imperial status derived from the fact that she was the mother of a potential future sultan. This term haseki sultan was given to any woman who entered the sultan’s bed. Hurrem Sultan was the first to hold this title after she became legally married to Suleiman the Magnificent, the first instance of a sultan marrying one of his slaves. Over time, the term haseki was no longer used because, it became very apparent that it didn't support the custom of honoring the valide sultan. 

The kadıns, or official concubines, were individually ranked by the sultan in order of preference. Most sultans kept four kadıns. These women had the social, but not legal, status of wife. The first  reported was during the reign of Mehmed IV.

She had a great influence in the harem. Before the creation and after the abolition of the title , the title  was the most powerful position among the sultan's consorts. A sultan did not have more than four s (the same law used for legal wives in Islam). Their position as the possible mother of a future sultan gave them much influence and power in the harem.

: These slave women needed not necessarily to have given a child to the sultan, but simply needed to have taken his fancy. Ikbals were women who were chosen to become the new Kadin. In some cases, they were also concubines. They, too, were ranked among one another by the sultan in order of preference.

They could be promoted to s which meant they earned wages, otherwise they were the property of the sultan and would reside in the harem. Newly arrived slave girls were called Acemi (novice) and Acemilik (novicitiate), and then Sakird (apprentice). Gedikli were the personal maidservants of the sultan. Cariye-women were manumitted to go after nine years of service, after which a marriage was arranged for them.

The number of women in the harem is contested and only possible to estimate during some periods. Contemporaries claimed that in 1573, there were 150 women in the New palace and 1,500 in the Old Palace, and that there were 1,100 - 1,200 in 1604-1607, but these numbers are likely overestimated.  The actual number of women are estimated to have been 49 in 1574 and 433 in 1633.  
In the 18th- and 19th-century, the official mevacib register is sometimes preserved, and notes that the harem contained 446 slave women during the reign of sultan Mahmud I (r.1730-1754), 720 during sultan Selim III (r. 1789-1808), and 473 during sultan Mahmud II (r.1808-1839).

Western perceptions of the harem 

The Ottoman Imperial Harem, like other aspects of Ottoman and Middle Eastern culture, was depicted by European artists, French artists, writers, and travelers. As Leslie Peirce writes, Europe found that all the power that the Ottoman Empire had was established in the Harem. Through their depictions of the Harem, members of European imperial powers imposed their constructions of social organization onto other cultures, assuming their social hierarchies as “part of the natural or divine order,” that all other societies must work towards achieving. In particular, European notions of race, sexuality, and gender heavily influenced their perception and depictions of life and politics in the Ottoman empire. The West’s assumed social organization was that of “public/commonwealth/male and private/domestic/female.” Conversely, in Ottoman society, politics and imperial activity occurred in private. Seclusion was not as actively gendered in a strict binary, because the privacy of both male and female members of the imperial family symbolized their power over the rest of society. Western depictions of the imperial harem also worked to gender the meaning of the title sultan.  Western tradition made this term synonymous with the male ruler of the empire, while the Ottomans themselves utilized this term to denote the power of prominent male and female members of the imperial household.

Orientalist paintings reflected Europe's eroticized view of Islam with luxury, leisure, and lust being common motifs. Similarly, writers focused on slavery and sexuality, and frequently compared Ottoman practices with those of the West. French artists such as Jean-Auguste-Dominique Ingres and Fernand Cormon painted some of the most recognizable orientalist artwork based on the imperial harem. The Turkish Bath and Harem, (both pictured), are two such examples. These images constituted the "imaginative geography" outlined in Edward Said's Orientalism. There was a prevalence of nudity in the bath scenes and the depiction of polygyny with multiple women and usually one man in the paintings. The women in these paintings were often portrayed as fair-skinned while the men were often painted as darker. The portraits of notable imperial harem women were less sexualized with many of them resembling traditional European portraits in their dress and physical features. Italian artist Titian's paintings of Hurrem Sultan and her daughter Mihrimah Sultan are extremely similar to his popular Portrait of a Lady, with the only notable difference being the Ottoman headdress. Of the artists who illustrated the Ottoman Imperial Harem, very few actually visited the empire, and all were male, so it is highly possible that these depictions were neither accurate nor authentic.

There were quite a few women who traveled to the Ottoman Empire and published their opinions on the harem. Lady Mary Montagu, an early eighteenth century English aristocrat and writer, was one such woman. Her husband served as the British Ambassador to Turkey, allowing her to spend time in the Ottoman Empire and write extensively about her experiences there. In her writings, she explained that the Ottoman women did not lack in their privileges due to their control over property, autonomy in the harem, and sexual liberty through the wearing of veils. Montagu admired Ottoman slave institutions and actively defended them, which was uncommon among British authors at that time. Montagu believed that conditions were worse for women in Europe than they were for women in the harem. In championing the way in which Ottoman women were treated, it appears Montagu may have been trying to bolster the feminist agenda in England. Like other female writers, Lady Mary also focused on the appearance of the women and their homes as markers of social status: ornate decoration, detailed dresses, and an abundance of jewels reflected higher social status. Lady Mary compares the beauty and manners of Fatima, a Turkish woman, to that of European women. Fatima would be considered beautiful “either in England or Germany” and could be “suddenly transported upon the most polite throne of Europe nobody would think her other than born and bred to be a queen, though educated in a country we call barbarous.” 

Grace Ellison was another woman who traveled to the Ottoman Empire and wrote of the imperial harem. In An Englishwoman in a Turkish Harem published in 1915, Ellison sought to “correct” the prejudice and hatred that dominated the British national attitude towards Turkey. She wrote of the beauty and grandeur of the Ottoman Empire and of the great friends she had made there. She spoke highly of the progressive movements in Turkey and claimed that rights for women were increasing. Ellison claimed the English should attempt to better understand the Turkish woman. She wrote that the Turkish woman is “proud” and “insists that her dignity be respected.” Ellison also spoke extensively on the institution of slavery in the Ottoman Empire and voiced her desire to save the women in the harem. She “longed to break down for them the lattice-work which is always there between them and the sun,” and lamented about the women’s ignorance of life outside the harem: “If they stay it is because they wish to stay, and are therefore happy. Their existence, however, seems a most heartrending waste of human life.” Her analysis of cruel and antiquated Ottoman practices was not limited to the concubines, as she described her interaction with eunuchs: “It is difficult for me, however, to remember that these poor mutilated anachronisms are great personages at the Ottoman Court.” Ellison condemned the act of veiling as form of “slavery”.

In 1868, Empress Eugénie of France visited the Imperial Harem, which had significant consequences. She was taken by Sultan Abdülaziz to greet his mother, Valide Sultan Pertevniyal Sultan. Reportedly, Pertevniyal became outraged by the presence of a foreign woman in her harem, and so she slapped the empress in the face, almost provoking an international incident. The visit of the empress, however, did lead to a dress reform in the harem. Western fashion grew popular among the harem women, who continued to dress according to Western fashion from then on. However, women from the west also started to become more curious about the fashion of the harem women. Lady Montagu was one of the women who became very passionate about the wardrobe of the ottoman women, and began to dress the same as they did.

See also 

 Abbasid harem
 Safavid imperial harem
 Qajar harem 
 Circassian beauties
 List of Orientalist artists
 List of Ottoman titles and appellations
 Orientalism
 Ottoman Sultans' concubines
 Women in the Ottoman Empire

References

Citations

Other sources

 İlhan Akşit. The Mystery of the Ottoman Harem. Akşit Kültür Turizm Yayınları. 
 Leslie P. Peirce. The Imperial Harem: Women and Sovereignty in the Ottoman Empire. Studies in Middle Eastern History. Oxford University Press, 1993.

Further reading

External links 
Channel 4 History | The sultanate of women
Topkapı Palace Harem Museum | Official Website

 
Topkapı Palace
Slavery in the Ottoman Empire
Concubines of the Ottoman Empire
Harem
Concubinage
Sexuality in the Middle East